Complete list of films produced by the Tollywood film industry based in Madras in 1950. Movies released 18

References

External links 
 Earliest Telugu language films at IMDb.com (122 to 135)
https://ghantasalagalamrutamu.blogspot.com/2012/09/1950.html

1950
Telugu
Telugu films